Air Commandant Dame Nancy Marion Salmon  (2 May 1906 – 9 October 1999), also known after 1962 by her married name, Dame Nancy Snagge, was a senior British women's air force officer. She was Director of the Women's Royal Air Force (WRAF) from 1950 to 1956.

Early life
Salmon was born in Hampstead the daughter of a chartered accountant and she was educated at Notting Hill High School. In 1938 she joined the Auxiliary Territorial Service as a driver.

Women's Auxiliary Air Force
Salmon transferred from the ATS to the Women's Auxiliary Air Force in 1939 when it was formed and her first posting was a barrage balloon unit. She later spent time as officer in charge of personnel at Fighter Command, RAF Stanmore before becoming a staff officer at No 77 Signals Wing in Liverpool. She was later responsible for WAAF radar operators. At the end of the 1940s she helped with drafting regulations and a plan for more integration with the Royal Air Force which led to the formation of the Women's Royal Air Force. Salmon was a staff officer in early 1950 with the British Air Forces of Occupation in Germany before becoming Director of the Women's Royal Air Force in July 1950. Salmon retired from the WRAF in 1956.

Personal life
Following retirement from the WRAF she cared for her mother before becoming head of personnel in the John Lewis partnership. At her new job she met a company director Geoffrey Snagge, a widower and they married in 1962. She died at Winchester, Hampshire on 9 October 1999.

Honours
She was appointed an Officer of the Order of the British Empire (OBE) in 1946, and elevated to Dame Commander of the Order of the British Empire (DBE) in 1955.

References

External links
 Peerage
 WRAF tribute site

1906 births
1999 deaths
Dames Commander of the Order of the British Empire
Women's Royal Air Force officers
Women's Auxiliary Air Force officers
People from Hampstead
People educated at Notting Hill & Ealing High School
Auxiliary Territorial Service soldiers